The 1988 New York Yankees season was the 86th season for the Yankees. The team finished with a record of 85–76, finishing in fifth place, 3.5 games behind the Boston Red Sox. New York was managed by Lou Piniella and Billy Martin, with the latter  managing the team for the fifth and final time. The Yankees played at Yankee Stadium.

Offseason
November 2, 1987: Lenn Sakata was released by the New York Yankees.
 December 11, 1987: Darren Reed, Phil Lombardi, and Steve Frey were traded by the Yankees to the New York Mets for Rafael Santana and Victor Garcia (minors).
December 18, 1987: Rich Bordi was released by the New York Yankees.
December 22, 1987: Steve Trout and Henry Cotto were traded by the Yankees to the Seattle Mariners for Lee Guetterman, Clay Parker, and Wade Taylor.
 January 15, 1988: John Candelaria was signed as a free agent by the Yankees.

Regular season

Opening Day starters

Season standings

Record vs. opponents

Notable transactions
 March 30, 1988: Orestes Destrade was traded by the Yankees to the Pittsburgh Pirates for Hipólito Peña.
 April 4, 1988: Rick Cerone was released by the Yankees.
 April 4, 1988: Jerry Royster was released by the New York Yankees.
 May 7, 1988: Chris Chambliss was signed as a free agent by the Yankees.
 May 10, 1988: Chris Chambliss was released by the Yankees.
 June 1, 1988: 1988 Major League Baseball Draft
Andy Cook was drafted by the Yankees in the 11th round.
Frank Seminara was drafted by the New York Yankees in the 12th round.
Deion Sanders was drafted by the Yankees in the 30th round. Player signed June 22, 1988.
 July 15, 1988: Luis Aguayo was traded by the Philadelphia Phillies to the New York Yankees for Amalio Carreno.
 July 21, 1988: Jay Buhner, Rich Balabon (minors), and a player to be named later were traded by the Yankees to the Seattle Mariners for Ken Phelps. The Yankees completed the deal by sending Troy Evers (minors) to the Mariners on October 12.
 August 30, 1988: Cecilio Guante was traded by the Yankees to the Texas Rangers for Dale Mohorcic.

Roster

Game log

Regular season

|- style="background:#cfc;"
| 1 || April 5 || 1:10pm EDT || Twins || W 8–0 || || || || || 55,802 || 1–0 || W1 ||
|- style="background:#cfc;"
| 2 || April 6 || 1:10pm EDT || Twins || W 5–3 || || || || || 32,756 || 2–0 || W2 ||
|- style="background:#bbb;"
|–|| April 7 || || Twins || colspan="9"|Postponed (Rain) (Makeup date: August 5)
|- style="background:#cfc;"
| 3 || April 8 || 7:35pm EDT || Brewers || W 6–4 || || || || || 20,927 || 3–0 || W3 ||
|- style="background:#cfc;"
| 4 || April 9 || 7:36pm EDT || Brewers || W 4–1 || || || || || 27,021 || 4–0 || W4 ||
|- style="background:#cfc;"
| 5 || April 10 || 1:36pm EDT || Brewers || W 7–6 || || || || || 36,214 || 5–0 || W5 ||
|- style="background:#fcc;"
| 6 || April 11 || 1:45pm EDT || @ Blue Jays || L 9–17 || || || || || 45,185 || 5–1 || L1 ||
|- style="background:#cfc;"
| 7 || April 12 || 7:36pm EDT || @ Blue Jays || W 12–3 || || || || || 24,116 || 6–1 || W1 ||
|- style="background:#cfc;"
| 8 || April 13 || 7:35pm EDT || @ Blue Jays || W 5–1 || || || || || 24,105 || 7–1 || W2 ||
|- style="background:#cfc;"
| 9 || April 14 || 12:36pm EDT || @ Blue Jays || W 7–3 || || || || || 24,524 || 8–1 || W3 ||
|- style="background:#cfc;"
| 10 || April 15 || 2:35pm EDT || @ Brewers || W 7–1 || || || || || 55,887 || 9–1 || W4 ||
|- style="background:#fcc;"
| 11 || April 16 || 4:08pm EDT || @ Brewers || L 2–9 || || || || || 24,972 || 9–2 || L1 ||
|- style="background:#fcc;"
| 12 || April 17 || 2:30pm EDT || @ Brewers || L 3–6 || || || || || 22,199 || 9–3 || L2 ||
|- style="background:#cfc;"
| 13 || April 18 || 8:09pm EDT || @ Twins || W 18–5 || || || || || 30,442 || 10–3 || W1 ||
|- style="background:#cfc;"
| 14 || April 19 || 8:05pm EDT || @ Twins || W 7–6 || || || || || 23,724 || 11–3 || W2 ||
|- style="background:#cfc;"
| 15 || April 20 || 8:05pm EDT || @ Twins || W 7–6  || || || || || 22,369 || 12–3 || W3 ||
|- style="background:#fcc;"
| 16 || April 22 || 7:39pm EDT || Blue Jays || L 4–6  || || || || || 33,314 || 12–4 || L1 ||
|- style="background:#fcc;"
| 17 || April 23 || 7:38pm EDT || Blue Jays || L 2–3 || || || || || 24,046 || 12–5 || L2 ||
|- style="background:#cfc;"
| 18 || April 24 || 1:38pm EDT || Blue Jays || W 5–3 || || || || || 52,073 || 13–5 || W1 ||
|-

|-

|-

|-

|-

|-

|-

|- style="text-align:center;"
| Legend:       = Win       = Loss       = PostponementBold = Yankees team member

Player stats

Batting

Starters by position
Note: Pos = Position; G = Games played; AB = At bats; H = Hits; Avg. = Batting average; HR = Home runs; RBI = Runs batted in

Other batters
Note: G = Games played; AB = At bats; H = Hits; Avg. = Batting average; HR = Home runs; RBI = Runs batted in

Pitching

Starting pitchers 
Note: G = Games pitched; IP = Innings pitched; W = Wins; L = Losses; ERA = Earned run average; SO = Strikeouts

Other pitchers 
Note: G = Games pitched; IP = Innings pitched; W = Wins; L = Losses; ERA = Earned run average; SO = Strikeouts

Relief pitchers 
Note: G = Games pitched; W = Wins; L = Losses; SV = Saves; ERA = Earned run average; SO = Strikeouts

Awards and records
 Rickey Henderson, Yankees Single Season Record, Stolen Bases in a Season  (93 in 1988)

Farm system 

LEAGUE CHAMPIONS: Albany-Colonie, Oneonta, GCL Yankees

References

External links
1988 New York Yankees at Baseball Reference
1988 New York Yankees team page at www.baseball-almanac.com

New York Yankees seasons
New York Yankees
New York Yankees
1980s in the Bronx